Capital Department is a  department of Córdoba Province in Argentina.

The provincial subdivision has a population of about 1,284,582 inhabitants in an area of  562 km². Its capital city is Córdoba, which is also the capital city of Córdoba Province. It is located around 710 km from Buenos Aires.

External links
Córdoba website 

Departments of Córdoba Province, Argentina